A login manager is a login system for Unix and Unix-like operating systems. It comprises a login daemon, a login user interface, and a system for tracking login sessions. When a user tries to log in, the login manager passes the user's credentials to an authentication system.

Since an X display manager is a graphical user interface for login, some people use the terms display manager and login manager synonymously.

systemd, an init daemon for Linux, has an integrated login manager; its login daemon is called logind. systemd's login manager is an alternative to ConsoleKit.

See also
 BSD Authentication
 Name Service Switch
 passwd
 Pluggable authentication module

References

Computer access control
Unix process- and task-management-related software